California's 21st district may refer to:

 California's 21st congressional district
 California's 21st State Assembly district
 California's 21st State Senate district